Kydonies is a village and a community of the Grevena municipality. Before the 2011 local government reform it was a part of the municipality of Kosmas o Aitolos, of which it was a municipal district. The 2011 census recorded 81 residents in the village and 104 residents in the community. The community of Kydonies covers an area of 18.829 km2.

Administrative division
The community of Kydonies consists of two separate settlements: 
Kydonies (population 81)
Leipsi (population 23)
The aforementioned population figures are as of 2011.

See also
 List of settlements in the Grevena regional unit

References

Populated places in Grevena (regional unit)